The US Yachts US 33 is an American sailboat that was designed by Doug Peterson as a racer-cruiser and first built in 1981.

The US Yachts US 33 is an unauthorized development of Peterson's International Offshore Rule Three-Quarter Ton class Chaser 33 racer, using the same hull design from the original molds and a new deck, but with no royalties paid.

Production
The design was built by US Yachts in the United States, between 1981 and 1983, but it is now out of production.

Design
The US Yachts US 33 is a recreational keelboat, built predominantly of fiberglass, with wood trim. It has a masthead sloop rig, a raked stem, a reverse transom, an internally mounted spade-type rudder controlled by a wheel and a fixed fin keel. It displaces  and carries  of ballast.

The design has sleeping accommodation for six people, with a double "V"-berth in the bow cabin, a "V"-shaped settee in the main cabin and an aft cabin with a double berth on the port side. The galley is located on the port side amidships and is equipped with a two-burner stove and a double sink. The head is located next to the companionway steps, on the starboard side.

See also
List of sailing boat types

References

Keelboats
1980s sailboat type designs
Sailing yachts 
Sailboat type designs by Doug Peterson
Sailboat types built by US Yachts